Vincent Lange (born 15 June 1974 in Berlin) actor, producer, sports manager and coach, ex volleyball player from Germany, who competed for the Men's National Team in the 2000s. He played as a receiver/spiker and libero.

Honours
(Beach Volleyball Pro / International Tournaments & Top Rankings 1997 - 2001)
2001 European Championship — 9th place
2002 FIVB World League — 9th place
(German Champion 2003 / SCC Berlin)
(European Cup Champion 2006 / Copra Berni Piacenza)

References

External links
 
 

German men's volleyball players
Volleyball players from Berlin
1974 births
Living people